Marina South MRT station is a non-operational underground Mass Rapid Transit station on the Thomson–East Coast line. Situated in Straits View and Marina South, Singapore, it is located close to Marina South Pier. First announced in August 2012 as part of the Thomson line (TSL), the station was constructed as part of TEL Phase 3 (TEL3) with the merger of the TSL and the Eastern Region line (ERL). 

Initially slated to open along with the rest of the TEL3 stations, it was announced in November 2021 that the station would only open when its surrounding areas are further developed, even though it has been structurally completed. Since operations for TEL3 began on 13 November 2022, trains would skip this station and continue its journey towards Gardens By The Bay or Marina Bay.

History
Marina South station was first announced as part of the 22-station Thomson line on 29 August 2012. In July 2014, the Land Transport Authority (LTA) awarded the contract for the design and construction of the station and associated tunnels to a joint venture between Sinohydro Corp and Sembcorp Design and Construction at S$488 million (US$ million).

On 15 August 2014, the LTA further announced that the TSL would merge with the Eastern Region line to form the Thomson–East Coast line (TEL). Marina South station, part of the proposed line, would be constructed as part of TEL3, consisting of 13 stations between Mount Pleasant and Gardens by the Bay.

With restrictions imposed on construction due to the COVID-19 pandemic, the TEL3 completion date was pushed to 2022. On 23 November 2021, it was announced that the station's opening would be pushed to a later date until its surrounding areas are further developed.

References

Mass Rapid Transit (Singapore) stations